Prakash Uttamrao Dahake was a member of the Maharashtra Legislative Assembly, representing Karanja. He belongs to the Nationalist Congress Party. He defeated the incumbent MLA, Rajendra Patni, by 30,000 votes in the 2009 elections. In the 2014 elections, Rajendra Patni defeated him again for the second time after the 2004 assembly elections. Prakash Dahake could not even get the NCP party ticket despite being the incumbent MLA. He therefore slipped to third place in the 2014 elections. Prakash Dahake lost 4 of the 5 assembly elections he contested and could win only once.

Died :

References

Living people
Maharashtra MLAs 2009–2014
People from Washim district
Nationalist Congress Party politicians from Maharashtra
Marathi politicians
Year of birth missing (living people)
Indian National Congress politicians from Maharashtra